The following is a list of remote companies. A fully remote company, or a distributed company, does not have a physical office where employees work and may have a mailbox as a headquarters locations. Their workers have the option of remote working. Many fully remote companies employ workers in several time zones.

Benefits of being fully remote are: not having to pay office rent, the ability to expand quickly, and not being constrained by location when hiring employees. A downside is that being physically together could help employees better communicate and come up with ideas. Another downside is that employees may feel secluded from their coworkers whom they do not see in person. This could cause them not to have compassion for each other. To build a sense of community, fully remote companies have held frequent meetups and retreats that last a week. Companies participating in the fully remote experience include those in the technology, e-commerce, and e-learning sectors. There are about 100 fully remote companies that employ 10 or more people. GitLab, a fully remote company that employees 1,100 people based in over 60 countries, is one of the largest all-remote companies.

Fully remote companies
The list includes only companies that have been noted by sources as being former or current fully remote companies:
Andela
Automattic
Buffer
Deel
DuckDuckGo
Egenera
Emsisoft Ltd.
Ghost
GitLab
Help Scout
Hubstaff
Lokalise
TheLadders.com
Mapillary
Product Hunt
Shopify
Superside
Toggl
Toptal
Zapier

References

 
Remote